Nastoychivy is a  of the Soviet and later Russian navy. Previously she was named Moskovsky Komsomolets before being renamed on 15 February 1992.

Development and design 

The project began in the late 1960s when it was becoming obvious to the Soviet Navy that naval guns still had an important role particularly in support of amphibious landings, but existing gun cruisers and destroyers were showing their age. A new design was started, employing a new 130 mm automatic gun turret.

Construction and career 
Moskovsky Komsomolets was laid down on 7 April 1981 and launched on 19 January 1991 by Severnaya Verf in Leningrad. Before her commissioning on 30 December 1992, she was renamed Nastoychivy.

On July 31, 2011, the Navy Day, Russian President Dmitry Medvedev visited the destroyer at the main naval base of the Baltic Fleet in the city of Baltiysk (Kaliningrad region).

Currently, Nastoychivy is the flagship of the Baltic Fleet of the Russian Navy. For twenty years of combat service, the destroyer was at sea for a total of about two years and covered more than 70,000 nautical miles.

In recent years, the flagship of the Baltic Fleet did not go on long voyages, going through the restoration of technical readiness in Baltiysk. In 2015, she occasionally took part in naval activities: in March she went to sea during a surprise check of the combat readiness of the Western Military District, in July, she took part in a parade in honor of Navy Day. According to the procurement data of 33 Shipyard, which serves the ships of the Baltic Fleet, the systems of the main power plant (boiler and turbine), life support equipment, and ship armament are being repaired aboard the Nastoichivny.

Since 2019, the destroyer has been undergoing scheduled repairs, during which the propulsion system will be replaced and a number of ship's life support systems will be repaired.

Gallery

References 

1991 ships
Ships of the Soviet Union
Ships built at Severnaya Verf
Naval ships of the Soviet Union
Sovremenny-class destroyers